Naa Peru Surya, Naa Illu India is a 2018 Indian Telugu-language action film written and directed by Vakkantham Vamsi in his directorial debut. Produced by Ramalakshmi Cine Creations, the film stars Allu Arjun, Arjun Sarja, Anu Emmanuel and R. Sarathkumar. In the film, a soldier struggling with anger issues is challenged to change his behavior in order to fulfill his dream of serving at the borders. Supporting cast includes Boman Irani, Thakur Anoop Singh, Sai Kumar, Pradeep Rawat, Harish Uthaman, Rao Ramesh, Nadhiya and Vennela Kishore. The music was composed by Vishal–Shekhar with editing by Kotagiri Venkateswara Rao.

The film was released on 4 May 2018. The reception was mixed, with praise towards the performances of Allu Arjun, R.Sarathkumar & Arjun Sarja and production values, but criticism towards the script, lengthy runtime, slow pace& direction. R. Sarathkumar won SIIMA Award for Best Actor in a Negative Role (Telugu) for his role in the film.

Plot 
Surya is a soldier in the Indian Army who suffers from anger management issues and dreams of being posted at the LOC. After getting into a brawl at a local club and attacking Inspector Himanshu Negi and stealing the latter's gun, Surya uses it to shoot dead a terrorist right when the officer comes to ask for the gun from Surya's senior Col. Sanjay Shrivastav. Surya's dreams are now shattered after being Court Martialled for indisciplinary action. His godfather requests Shrivastav to give Surya a final chance. Shrivastav agrees on the condition that Surya gets a signature of approval from the country's top psychologist and the Dean of the Institution of Psychology and Foreign Languages, Dr. Rama Krishnam Raju, who happens to be Surya's estranged father.

In order to fulfill his dream of going to the border, Surya agrees, taking up home with a passport officer named Kishore, who has been waiting for a year for a similar signature from Raju. Upon meeting, Surya and Raju refuse to acknowledge each other, and Raju questions Surya's personal life. Surya reveals to Raju about his relationship with Varsha, whom he broke up with when she distanced him on finding of his profession and his disrespecting her uncle. Surya gets frustrated, in turn accusing Raju of enjoying himself on listening to Surya's failures. Raju then reveals about Surya to the entire university.

Surya then takes up a challenge from Raju to control his anger for three weeks and not cause any fights from the following day. He, however, beats up a young gangster when the latter makes a commotion in the middle of the road, who is revealed to be the son of a dreaded gangster Challa, the very day before the challenge is to start, as a final fight. In the following days, Surya encounters several situations with Challa and his men; however, being able to control his anger and even becoming used to living within the society have reformed.

However, things take a turn when Surya ends up as the sole witness of the murder of Mustafa in the hands of Challa's son, over a property dispute. He keeps quiet about this, as he learns from the society. However, he is guilt-tripped when Police Officer Krishna Kumar, who was investigating Mustafa's murder, addresses him as someone who made a great impact on the latter's life. Meanwhile, Surya reconciles with his father, returns to his family, makes up with Varsha, and seemingly has won the challenge. However, he addresses his mistake publicly and refuses to take the signature. Having completely realized his error, Surya attacks and kidnaps Challa's son, asking Challa to help him find Mustafa's son Anwar, who expressed his hatred against the nation, which he believes did not recognize his father's sacrifices or death and left his home. Surya fears that Anwar may follow a wrong path, and both he and Challa set off on a mission to recover Anwar.

On finding Anwar in Mumbai, Surya makes him realize his mistake and warns him not to take the wrong route in life, after which Anwar shows his care for his nation. Surya receives Raju's signature, and a few months later, he is shown to be standing at the border hoisting the Indian Flag.

Cast

Production 
The film marks the debut of Vamsi as a director. Vamsi has previously written stories for successful films such as Kick (2009) and Race Gurram (2014). The film stars Allu Arjun and Anu Emmanuel while Arjun Sarja and R. Sarathkumar play supporting roles. Kotagiri Venkateswara Rao, Rajeev Ravi and Rajeevan are the editor, cinematographer and art director respectively.

Soundtrack 
The soundtrack for the film was composed by Vishal–Shekhar. The original score is composed by Vishal–Shekhar and John Stewart Eduri. After a successful collaboration in Tiger Zinda Hai, Vishal–Shekhar cast Meghdeep Bose to produce their songs for this album. The first single from the film, "Sainika", was released on Indian Republic Day, 26 January 2018, as a tribute to the soldiers of the Indian Army. The film's second single "Lover Also, Fighter Also" was released on 14 February 2018. The Naa Peru Surya Naa Illu India audio launch event was held on 22 April at Military Madhavaram, West Godavari, Andhra Pradesh. The Naa Peru Surya- Naa Illu India pre-release event was organized on 29 April at Gachibowli Stadium, Hyderabad.

Release 
The film was scheduled to release on 27 April 2018, due to post-production delays, the release date was pushed to 4 May 2018. The film was released on 4 May 2018 along with its dubbed versions simultaneously in Tamil as En Peyar Surya, En Veedu India,  in Malayalam as Ente Peru Surya Ente Veedu India and in Hindi on TV, OTT as Surya The Soldier.

Critical reception 
Naa Peru Surya, Naa Illu India received mixed reviews but critics appreciated Allu Arjun's performance, calling it the "biggest strength to the film." and his "career-best performance". The Hans India critic Vyas gave it 3.25/5 stars, writing, "Na Peru Surya, Na Illu India is a film that gives us solid entertainment throughout the movie. The film starts off impressively and takes a U-turn to the interval point. The best part of the movie is that the director is stuck to the core point and did not deviate himself from the main content" Idlebrain.com gave it a 3/5 rating and wrote: "Though the director tried to cater to all cross section of audiences by having all types of elements in the first half, he made sure that he sticks to the basic plot of the film towards the climax. Allu Arjun stands out in the film with his stylish and terrific performance."

Neeshitha Nyapati of The Times of India gave it 2.5/5 stars, reviewing, "Naa Peru Surya, Naa Illu India is a hard film to describe, what with so much happening in a span of fewer than 3 hours. The film has all the requirements of a commercial potboiler – there's unbridled patriotism, a love track, a family drama, an ambitious man striving to make it big in his career, several points of conflict replete with goondas and other moral dilemmas that all play out, interspersed at regular intervals with colourful and highly choreographed songs." Priyanka Sundar in her Hindustan Times review gave it 2.5/5 stars, concluding, "Naa Peru Surya is a film that would work purely because of dramatic emotional moments in combination with the high powered action sequence, something that Tollywood is well known for."

Re-release in Hindi
In December 2020, the film was re-released in the states of Uttar Pradesh and Bihar with 50% cap on theatre occupancy due to COVID-19 pandemic. The Hindi dubbed version, title "Surya: The Soldier", is well received at the box office, despite releasing after 3 years post original release, and being available on YouTube and Zee5.

References

External links 
 

2018 films
2010s Telugu-language films
Indian action films
Films about psychiatry
2018 action films
Films scored by Vishal–Shekhar
Indian Army in films
Films set in Jammu and Kashmir
Films set in Dehradun
Films set in Mumbai
Films shot in Jammu and Kashmir
Films shot in Uttarakhand
Films shot in Darjeeling
Films shot in Mumbai
Films shot in Visakhapatnam
2018 directorial debut films
Films set in Visakhapatnam
Films shot in Andhra Pradesh
Films set in Andhra Pradesh